Terra Nuova is an international non-governmental organization. Founded in 1969 and headquartered in Italy, It focuses on promoting equitable and sustainable socio-economic development in various African and Latin America countries, including Mali, Kenya, Peru and Nicaragua. Terra Nuova works in partnership with pastoralists, smallholder farmers, entrepreneurs in the urban and rural informal sector, and local communities with the aim to improve their socio-economic status and understanding of domestic, regional and global dynamics.

Projects

Trans-Boundary Environmental Project 

The Trans-Boundary Environmental Project (TEP) was a European-Union funded project running from June 2003 to September 2007. The project addressed natural resource conservation and poverty alleviation in the pastoral semi-arid region of the North Eastern Province of Kenya and southern Somalia.
In partnership with the Arid Lands Resource Management Project (ALRMP) , local communities, authorities and other institutions, Terra Nuova set following four objectives:
 Collect, analyze and disseminate environmental and socio-economic information on the ecosystem.
 Raise awareness among local communities and strengthen their environmental skills.
 Develop the communities, thereby concentrating on sustainable micro-projects for alternative income generation.
 Support the set up of agreements and regional plans for the conservation and management of natural resources.
The project produced eleven research papers and supported various community-based initiatives, including the Ishaqbini Hirola Conservancy and the Bour-Algi Giraffe Sanctuary.

External links
 Homepage of Terra Nuova
 Transboundary Environmental Project (TEP) by Terra Nuova

Partners in East Africa 

 Arid Lands Resource Management Project by the Office of the President of Kenya
 National Museums of Kenya
 National Environmental Management Authority of Kenya 
 Kenya Wildlife Service

Environmental organisations based in Italy
International environmental organizations
Charities based in Italy
Foreign charities operating in Kenya
Foreign charities operating in Mali
Foreign charities operating in Nicaragua
Foreign charities operating in Peru